Bugeaters FC are a semi-pro soccer team based in Omaha, Nebraska that currently competes in the Great Plains Premier League.

History
Bugeaters FC was announced as a United Premier Soccer League expansion team on December 12, 2017. The club was founded by Nebraska native Jonathan Collura.

The club's name is homage to the old nickname of native born Nebraskans as "Bugeaters."

During their inaugural season, the Bugeaters played in Lincoln, Nebraska at Lincoln High School's Beechner Athletic Complex. For the 2019 Season, the club reached an agreement to play their home matches at Creighton University's Morrison Stadium in Omaha, Nebraska. The 2019 season will be an entirely exhibition season and starting in 2020, Bugeaters FC will become members of the Great Plains Premier League, an expansion sister league/conference to the Gulf Coast Premier League.

In May 2019, they announced a partnership with the academy of English club Huddersfield Town.

Year-by-Year

Staff

Current roster

References

External links
Official Website

Association football clubs established in 2017
Soccer clubs in Nebraska
2017 establishments in Nebraska
Sports in Omaha, Nebraska
Sports in Lincoln, Nebraska